Gößnitz is a former municipality in the district of Voitsberg in the Austrian state of Styria. Since the 2015 Styria municipal structural reform, it is part of the municipality Maria Lankowitz.

References

Cities and towns in Voitsberg District